Phù Cừ is a rural district of Hưng Yên province in the Red River Delta region of Vietnam. As of 2003, the district had a population of 88,605. The district covers an area of 94 km2. The district capital lies at Trần Cao.

Administrative divisions
Phù Cừ district is divided into the following divisions: Đình Cao, Trần Cao, Đoàn Đào, Phan Sào Nam, Minh Hoàng, Quang Hưng, Minh Tân, La Tiến, Tống Trân, Tam Đa, Nhật Quang and Tiên Tiến.

References

Districts of Hưng Yên province